Palmersville is a Tyne and Wear Metro station, serving the village of Holystone and suburb of Forest Hall, North Tyneside in Tyne and Wear, England. It joined the network on 19 March 1986.

History
The station is situated on the opposite side of the bridge with Great Lime Road to the short-lived former station, . It was opened by the North Eastern Railway on 1 July 1909, closing on 20 September 1915, as part of an economy measure during the First World War. 

Prior to the opening of the station, the distance between Benton and Shiremoor was the longest between stations on the network.

In 2011, Palmersville was the first station on the network to be fitted with new ticket machines and smartcard validators, as part of the Metro: All Change programme. A total of 225 new ticket machines were installed, at 60 stations, between 2011 and 2013.

The station was used by 221,793 passengers in 2017–18, making it the third-least-used station in North Tyneside, after Hadrian Road (141,431) and Percy Main (203,204).

Facilities 
Step-free access is available at all stations across the Tyne and Wear Metro network, with ramped access to both platforms. The station is equipped with ticket machines, waiting shelter, seating, next train information displays, timetable posters, and an emergency help point on both platforms. Ticket machines are able to accept payment with credit and debit card (including contactless payment), notes and coins. The station is also fitted with smartcard validators, which feature at all stations across the network.

There is no dedicated car parking available at the station. There is the provision for cycle parking, with five cycle pods available for use.

Services 
, the station is served by up to five trains per hour on weekdays and Saturday, and up to four trains per hour during the evening and on Sunday.

Rolling stock used: Class 599 Metrocar

References

External links
 
 Timetable and station information for Palmersville

Metropolitan Borough of North Tyneside
1986 establishments in England
Railway stations in Great Britain opened in 1986
Tyne and Wear Metro Yellow line stations
Transport in Tyne and Wear
